Sudeep Sen (born 1964) is an Indian English poet and editor.

Early life 
He was educated at St Columba's School in Delhi and received a degree in English literature from Hindu College, University of Delhi. He received a master's degree from the Columbia University Graduate School of Journalism in New York City. Sen also received a master's degree in English and creative writing from Hollins University, and was an international scholar at Davidson College. From 1992 to 1993 he was international poet-in-residence at the Scottish Poetry Library in Edinburgh, and in 1995 he was a visiting scholar at Harvard University. In 1995 he set up a poetry publishing company, Aark Arts. He has a son named Aria.

Works 
Sen's books include Postmarked India: New & Selected Poems, Rain, Aria, Postcards from Bangladesh, Fractals: New & Selected Poems | Translations 1980-2015 and EroText.

Poetry 
 Leaning Against the Lamp-Post (1983)
 The Man in the Hut (1986)
 The Lunar Visitations (1990)
 Kali in Ottava Rima (1992)
 Parallel (1993)
 New York Times (1993)
 South African Woodcut (1994)
 Mount Vesuvius in Eight Frames (1994)
 Dali's Twisted Hands (1995)
 Postmarked India: New & Selected Poems (1997)
 Retracing American Contours (1999)
 A Blank Letter (2000)
 Lines of Desire (2000)
 Almanac (2000)
 Perpetual Diary (2001)
 Monsoon (2002)
 Distracted Geography: An Archipelago of Intent (2003)
 Prayer Flag (2003)
 Rain (2005)
 Heat (2009)
 Winter Frances (2010)
 Mediterraneo (2012)
 Ladakh (2012)
 Fractals: New & Selected Poems|Translations 1978-2013 (2013)
 Fractals: New & Selected Poems | Translations 1980-2015  (2015)
 Incarnat | Incarnadine (2017)
 Path to Inspiration (2017) (with Setsuko Klossowska de Rola & Homa Arzhangi)

Prose 
 Postcards from Bangladesh (2002) (with Tanvir Fattah & Kelley Lynch)
 BodyText: Dramatic Monologues in Motion (2009)
 EroText (2016)

Translations 
 In Another Tongue (2000)
 Love & Other Poems (2001)
 Spellbound & Other Poems (2003)
 Love Poems (2005) 
 Aria (2009)

Editor, co-editor 
1995 Wasafiri: Contemporary Writing from India, South Asia and the Diaspora. University of London.
1996 Lines Review Twelve Modern Young Indian Poets. Edinburgh: Lines Review.
1998 Index for Censorship (poems); Songs of Partition (portfolio). London: Index for Censorship
2001-18: Six Seasons Review. Dhaka: University Press Limited & London: Aark Arts.
2001 Hayat Saif: Selected Poems. Dhaka: Pathak Samabesh.
2001 The British Council Book of Emerging English Poets from Bangladesh. Dhaka: The British Council.
2002 Dash: Four New German Writers. Berlin: Humboldt University & London: Aark Arts.
2002 Shawkat Haider: A Day with Destiny. Dhaka: Azeez.
2004 Midnight's Grandchildren: Post-Independence English Poetry from India. Macedonia: Struga Poetry Evenings .
2005 Sestet: Six New Writers. Berlin: Free University & London: Aark Arts.
2006 Biblio South Asian English Poetry (portfolio). New Delhi: Biblio.
2006–present Atlas: New Writing, Art & Image. London, New York, New Delhi: Aark Arts.
2009 The Literary Review. Indian Poetry. Fairleigh Dickinson University.
2010 World Literature Today: Writing from Modern India. University of Oklahoma.
2011 Poetry Review Centrefold Portfolio of Indian Poetry. UK: Poetry Review.
2012 The HarperCollins Book of English Poetry. HarperCollins.
2012 The Yellow Nib: Modern English Poetry by Indians. Belfast: Seamus Heaney Centre for Poetry, Queens University.
2013: The Prairie Schooner Feast Anthology of Poetry by Indian Women. University of Nebraska.
2015: World English Poetry. Dhaka: Bengal Foundation.

Awards

References

Further reading

External links
 Personal website
British Council profile
Listen to Sudeep Sen reading his poetry - a British Library recording, 1 November 2010.

1964 births
Living people
Columbia University Graduate School of Journalism alumni
Sudeep, Sen
Harvard University staff
Indian male poets
St. Columba's School, Delhi alumni
Delhi University alumni